Acalolepta bifasciata is a species of beetle in the family Cerambycidae.

References

Acalolepta
Beetles described in 1833
Beetles of Asia